Luz Maria Genes Garcete (born 2 February 1984) is a Paraguayan handball player for Club Cerro Porteño and the Paraguay national team.

She was selected to represent Paraguay at the 2017 World Women's Handball Championship.

References

1984 births
Living people
Paraguayan female handball players